The Defence of Duffer's Drift is a short 1904 book by Ernest Dunlop Swinton. 
Lieutenant Backsight Forethought (BF) and his command of fifty men are given the task to defend Duffer's Drift, a natural ford to a river.  A large force of Boers, unknown to BF, is moving toward his position. This scenario is played out six separate times, in six "dreams." In the early scenarios, BF and his British troops are ignominiously defeated. After each defeat, BF learns lessons and adapts his strategy for the later encounters. The later dreams end more inconclusively, and in the final dream, BF and his command successfully hold out long enough to be relieved. The book encourages critical thinking and careful use of position and terrain to mount a successful defence.

The book has been imitated many times, both for the British Army and for the US Army, and new adaptations continue to appear in the 21st century.

History

The Defence of Duffer's Drift was published in 1904 when Swinton was a field officer in the British Army. It appeared in the British United Service Magazine under the pseudonym, Lieutenant N. Backsight Forethought ("BF"), who is the narrator of the book. The book is an exploration of small unit tactics in a fictional encounter in the Second Boer War. Swinton was a captain of the Royal Engineers in South Africa during the Boer War, and the book "embodies some recollections of things actually done and undone in South Africa, 1899–1902."

The Defence of Duffer's Drift was reprinted in the April 1905 edition of the Journal of the United States Infantry Association. The book, especially intended for young lieutenants, has become a military staple on small unit tactics, read far afield in places such as the United States, Russia, and Canada. While some of the advice has become rather dated—notably, BF eventually decides to imprison all nearby locals, shoot any livestock that could be of aid to the enemy, and impress both Boer and black alike into building fortifications for his men, an "approach to the human terrain that would spell disaster" in modern times—the book is still considered relevant and interesting.

Storyline

Lieutenant Backsight Forethought (BF to his friends) has been left in command of a 50-man reinforced platoon to hold Duffer's Drift, the only ford on the Silliassvogel River available to wheeled traffic. Here is his chance for fame and glory. He has passed his officer courses and special qualifications. "Now if they had given me a job, say like fighting the Battle of Waterloo, or Gettysburg, or Bull Run, I knew all about that, as I had crammed it up..." While BF's task appears simple enough the Boer enemy causes a multitude of problems, but the astute reader, with a sharp mind and quick intellect, will no doubt solve the problem before the first shot is fired.

In his first two dreams, the British force is ambushed without much of a fight.  Fortifications are not prepared and the sentries announce their locations, allowing the Boers to easily sneak up and defeat the sleepy British soldiers without resistance.  In the third and fourth dreams, BF takes more proactive defensive preparations - digging trenches, arresting the local Boer civilians rather than attempting to trade or communicate with them, and impounding them and local black civilians for forced labour.  While able to slow the Boers down some, poor placement of trenches, lack of supplies, obvious fortifications that the enemy can easily detect and plan around, and other problems hamper the British resistance.  The fifth and sixth dreams are the most successful; in them, BF creates a spread-out and concealed force that greatly hampers and slows the enemy, even to the point of turning them back in the sixth dream, which allows for BF to obtain reinforcements.

Lessons learned

The following are the lessons learned discussed in this book.

Do not put off taking measures of defence till the morrow, as these are more important than the comfort of the soldiers or the shipshape arrangement of the camp. Choose the position of the camp mainly with reference to defence.
Do not in war-time show stray men of the enemy's breed all over the camp, be they never so kind and full of butter, and do not be hypnotised, by numerous "passes," at once to confide in them.
Do not let sentries advertise their position to the whole world, including the enemy, by standing in the full glare of a fire, and making much noise every half-hour.
Do not, if avoidable, be in tents when bullets are ripping through them; at such times a hole in the ground is worth many tents.
With modern rifles, to guard a drift or locality does not necessitate sitting on top of it (as if it could be picked up and carried away), unless the locality is suitable to hold for other and defensive reasons. It may even be much better to take up defensive position some way from the spot, and so away from concealed ground, which enables the enemy to crawl up to very close range, concealed and unperceived, and to fire from cover which hides them even when shooting. It would be better, if possible, to have the enemy in the open, or to have what is called a clear "field of fire."  A non-bullet-proof parapet or shelter which is visible serves merely to attract bullets instead of keeping them out—the proof of thickness can be easily and practically tested. When fired at by an enemy at close range from nearly all round, a low parapet and shallow trench are not of much use, as what bullets do not hit the defenders on one side hit those on another.
It is not enough to keep strange men of the enemy's breed away from the actual defences, letting them go free to warn the enemy of their existence and whereabouts—even though they should not be under temptation to impart any knowledge they may have obtained. "Another way," as the cookery book says, more economical in lives, would be as follows: Gather and warmly greet a sufficiency of strangers. Stuff well with chestnuts as to the large force about to join you in a few hours; garnish with corroborative detail, and season according to taste with whiskey or tobacco. This will very likely be sufficient for the nearest commando. Probable cost—some heavy and glib lying, but no lives will be expended.
It is not business to allow lazy black men (even though they be brothers and neutrals) to sit and pick their teeth outside their kraals whilst tired white men are breaking their hearts trying to do heavy labour in short time. It is more the duty of a Christian soldier to teach the dusky neutral the dignity of labour, and to keep him under guard, to prevent his going away to talk about it. (This lesson has often been edited in later revisions to be merely "lazy men" rather than "lazy black men" or "dusky neutral", and "soldiers" rather than "white men.")
When collecting the friendly stranger and his sons in order to prevent their taking information to the enemy, if you are wishful for a "surprise packet," do not forget also to gather his wife and his daughter, his manservant and his maidservant (who also have tongues), and his ox and his ass (which may possibly serve the enemy). Of course, if they are very numerous or very far off, this is impossible; only do not then hope to surprise the enemy.
Do not forget that, if guns are going to be used against you, a shallow trench with a low parapet some way from it is worse than useless, even though the parapet be bulletproof ten times over. The trench gives the gunners an object to lay on, and gives no protection from shrapnel. Against well-aimed long-range artillery fire it would be better to scatter the defenders in the open hidden in grass and bushes, or behind stones or ant hills, than to keep them huddled in such a trench. With the defending soldiers scattered around, you can safely let the enemy fill the visible trench to the brim with shrapnel bullets.
Though to stop a shrapnel bullet much less actual thickness of earth is necessary than to stop a rifle bullet, yet this earth must be in the right place. For protection you must be able to get right close under the cover. As narrow a trench as possible, with the sides and inside of the parapet as steep as they will stand, will give you the best chance. To hollow out the bottom of the trench sides to give extra room be even better, because the open top of the trench can be kept the less wide. The more like a mere slit the open top of the trench is, the fewer shrapnel bullets will get in.
For a small isolated post and an active enemy, there are no flanks, no rear, or, to put it otherwise, it is front all round.
Beware of being taken in reverse; take care, when placing and making defences, that when you are engaged in shooting the enemy to the front of the trench, his pal cannot sneak up and shoot you in the back.
Beware of being enfiladed. It is nasty from one flank—far worse from both flanks.
Do not position the trench near rising ground over which you cannot see, and which you cannot hold.
Do not huddle all the defending soldiers together in a small trench like sheep in a pen. Give them air.
As once before—cover from sight is of often worth more than cover from bullets.  For close shooting from a non-concealed trench, head cover with loopholes is an advantage. This should be bulletproof and not be conspicuously on the top of the parapet, so as to draw fire, or it will be far more dangerous than having none.
To surprise the enemy is a great advantage.
If you wish to obtain this advantage, conceal the position. Though for promotion it may be sound to advertise the position, for defence it is not.
To test the concealment or otherwise of a position, look at it from the enemy's point of view.
Beware of convex hills and dead ground. Especially take care to have some place where the enemy must come under defensive fire. Choose the exact position of the firing trenches, with an eye at the level of the men who will eventually use them.
A hill may not, after all, though it has "command," necessarily be the best place to hold.
A conspicuous "bluff" trench may cause the enemy to waste much ammunition, and draw fire away from the actual defences.

Influence

The Defence of Duffer's Drift's style of literary fiction has been copied by several authors, making this author an influence upon the writings of others. Some examples are provided below, including: a primer on World War I battalion level combined arms tactics incorporating new types of warfare (tanks, machine guns, and aviation), a mechanized battalion level primer, a military combat service support example, one that is non-military related, and one adopting the parable to operations in Iraq.

The first example is Battle of Booby's Bluffs, originally published in 1921 by an Army officer under the pseudonym Major Single List. It is important for its "lessons-learned" examination of the new weapons introduced in the Great War (most notably tanks, machine guns and aeroplanes) and how these innovations required learning new combined arms tactics. In the style of Duffer's Drift, a hapless battalion commander faces a battle scenario in a series of six dreams. In the first dream, he makes so many mistakes as to prove catastrophic for him and his men. But he learns a few more things about tactics and leadership through each dream, until at last he leads his men to victory through the treacherous terrain of Booby's Bluffs. Included with the dreams are notations to real life mistakes made by American commanders during the War.

Defense of Hill 781, written by James R. McDonough in 1988, deals with a somewhat larger combat element than Duffer's Drift, and having a slightly different reason for the "dreams".

The Defense of Duffer's Drift Brigade Support Area was written by Staff Sergeants Reginald Scott and Steve Newman, along with Sergeants William Baucom, Rodney Weathers, and Louise Chee in the September 2001 edition of NCO Notes, number 01-2, from the Association of the United States Army (AUSA) Institute of Land Warfare.   Instead of trying to teach infantry tactics, the authors of this story focused upon a supply company of a forward support battalion in an effort to teach units inside of a Brigade Support Area to become more effective in defensive operations during combat.

The winter 2005 edition of the Canadian Army Journal contained the following praise:

The Defense of Jisr Al Doreaa is a 2009 novella by two US Army captains, based on The Defence of Duffer's Drift, and meant to teach junior officers how to apply the basic principles of counter-insurgency.

The Defense of Battle Position Duffer is a publication created by the Asymmetric Warfare Group and Johns Hopkins University in 2016 that covers how commanders may integrate the cyber domain with tactical operations at the brigade combat team level. It follows Colonel Backsight Forethought V, a student of the Army War College, in a similar series of dreams where his mission as a brigade commander in varying scenarios are hampered by more cyber-proficient enemy commanders. Eventually, after integrating a litany of lessons learned throughout previous dreams, he is able to finally defeat a determined enemy with minimal losses.

Dominating Duffer's Domain is a 2017 report in the Duffer's Drift idiom meant to instruct U.S. Army information operations practitioners.

Notes

References

Bibliography

External links 

 Marines: Full text with biography, background, glossary, maps (PDF)
 Gutenberg: Full text of The Defence of Duffer's Drift (HTML, TXT)

Military strategy books
1904 books
Works published under a pseudonym
Works originally published in British magazines